Bedford Public Schools is a public school district in Temperance, Michigan. It is the smallest school district in Monroe County in terms of area. The district includes all of Bedford Township and a very small portion of Whiteford Township. The district has a population over 30,000, and has a current enrollment of about 5,400 students. Bedford Public Schools is placed #1 of opportunities in Monroe county in 2020 being the 10th in the state.

See also

WMLZ-LP

References

External links
Bedford Public Schools

School districts in Michigan
Education in Monroe County, Michigan